The sombre catshark (Bythaelurus incanus) is a species of catshark in the family Scyliorhinidae. It is known from a single specimen south of Rote Island, northwestern Australia. Its natural habitat is the open seas.

References

sombre catshark
Vertebrates of Western Australia
sombre catshark
Taxonomy articles created by Polbot